Peter Rowsthorn (born 9 February 1963) is an Australian stand-up comedian, actor, writer, producer, MC, and host.

Early life and education
Rowsthorn attended Trinity Grammar School and Rusden College, now part of Deakin University, where he obtained a teaching degree and he worked as a drama teacher, prior to his show business career

Career
Rowsthorn started performing as half of the comedy and singing duo The Cactus Brothers in 1983 while studying for his degree.

He first came to prominence as a stand-up comic and as a writer and performer on The Comedy Company (1989). Rowsthorn appeared with Warren Mitchell in the film Crackers (1998), was a lead in the Australian children's television show The Gift (1997), had small roles in Bad Eggs and Take Away (both 2003) and played an outrageous hairdresser called 'Miss Kafka' in the Sigrid Thornton telemovie Little Oberon (2005). He played Warren Cronkshonk in hospital spoof Let the Blood Run Free (1990–1992). 

He is probably best known for his TV work, particularly as Brett Craig in the hit series Kath & Kim (2002–2007) and 2012 movie, Kath & Kimderella. 

Rowsthorn was the host of factual show, Can We Help?, on ABC TV between 2006 and 2011.

Rowsthorn has also appeared on Thank God You're Here, Celebrity Name Game, Talkin' 'Bout Your Generation, Studio 10, Show Me the Movie! and Hughesy, We Have a Problem.

In 2018, Rowsthorn appeared on the fourth season of the Australian version of I'm a Celebrity...Get Me Out of Here!. On 7 March 2018, Rowsthorn was evicted after 40 days in the jungle, coming 6th place.

Personal life
Rowsthorn supports various charity and community groups including Oxfam.

Rowsthorn is a featured guest on SBS genealogy series Who Do You Think You Are?.

As of 2019, he resides in Perth, Western Australia.

References

External links

Australian male comedians
Australian male film actors
Australian male television actors
1963 births
Living people
People educated at Trinity Grammar School, Kew
20th-century Australian male actors
21st-century Australian male actors
I'm a Celebrity...Get Me Out of Here! (Australian TV series) participants
Male actors from Melbourne
Deakin University alumni